Officer 666 is a lost 1920 American silent comedy film directed by Harry Beaumont and starring Tom Moore. It is based on a 1912 Broadway play that originally starred Wallace Eddinger. Versions of the story were filmed in 1914 and 1916. This version was produced and distributed by Goldwyn Pictures.

Cast
Tom Moore as Travers Gladwyn
Jean Calhoun as Helen
Jerome Patrick as Alf Wilson
Harry Dunkinson as Policeman Phelan, Officer 666
Raymond Hatton as Whitney Barnes
Priscilla Bonner as Sadie
Kate Lester as Mrs. Burton
Hardee Kirkland as Police Captain
Maurice Bennett Flynn as Kearney (credited as M.B. Flynn)
George Kuwa as Bareatto
Albert Edmondson as Watkins (credited as Al Edmundson)

References

External links

1920 films
American silent feature films
Lost American films
American black-and-white films
Films directed by Harry Beaumont
Goldwyn Pictures films
Silent American comedy films
1920 comedy films
1920 lost films
Lost comedy films
1920s American films